Sadovo is a village in the Krasnoznamensky District, Kaliningrad Oblast, Russia. It is located in the historical region of Lithuania Minor.

History
The oldest known mention of the village comes from 1628, when it was part of Ducal Prussia. From the 18th century it formed part of the Kingdom of Prussia, from 1871 it was also part of Germany, within which it was administratively located in the province of East Prussia. After Germany's defeat in World War II, it passed to the Soviet Union.

References

Rural localities in Kaliningrad Oblast